The Composers Quarter Hamburg is a gathering of six museums in the Peterstraße in  Hamburg-Neustadt, Germany. The associated museums have one or two classical composers as a theme who were born or have lived in the city of Hamburg.

The museums are located in restored historical buildings. With the use of multimedia the lives and works of the composers are being cleared. Insight is being given why the composers may still matter in the current era.

The quarter is represented by the association with the same name that was founded in 2015. The following list shows the member museums, the composers that are themed and the year of establishment:
 Brahms Museum, Johannes Brahms, 1971
 Telemann Museum, Georg Philipp Telemann, 2011
 Carl Philipp Emanuel Bach Museum, Carl Philipp Emanuel Bach, 2015
 Johann Adolph Hasse Museum, Johann Adolph Hasse, 2015
 Gustav Mahler Museum, Gustav Mahler, 2018
 Fanny & Felix Mendelssohn Museum, Fanny and Felix Mendelssohn, 2018

See also 
 List of museums in Germany
 List of music museums

References 

Music museums in Germany
Museums in Hamburg